

Legend

List

References

2014-15